Tina Live in Europe is the first live album by Tina Turner, released on Capitol Records in 1988.

Composition
The album is compiled of live performances made between 1985 and 1987, the majority of which are from Turner's Break Every Rule World Tour but also from the 1985 Private Dancer Tour, as well as the 1986 Tina Turner: Break Every Rule HBO special recorded in London at the Camden Palace (now Koko), masquerading as Le Club Zero in Paris, also released on video.

The double CD version of Tina Live in Europe includes four bonus songs not featured on the original double vinyl album. Certain limited editions of the double LP included a bonus one-sided 7" single or CD single featuring an exclusive "Tender Remix" of "Two People", mixed by Ben Liebrand.

Critical reception
In 1989 the album won a Grammy Award for Best Female Rock Vocal Performance.

Single releases
Five singles were released from Tina Live In Europe; "Nutbush City Limits", a cover of Robert Palmer's "Addicted to Love, "Tonight" with David Bowie, "A Change Is Gonna Come" and "634–5789" with Robert Cray, the most successful being "Addicted to Love" which has since become a mainstay in Turner's live repertoire and was later included on the European editions of her 1991 hits compilation Simply the Best.

Track listing
Disc 1

Disc 2

B-sides

Personnel
Tina Turner – vocals

The Tina Turner Band
Jamie Ralston – guitar, vocals
Laurie Wisefield – guitar
Bob Feit – bass guitar, vocals
Jack Bruno – drums
Stevie Scales – percussion
John Miles – keyboards, vocals
Ollie Marland – keyboards, vocals
Deric Dyer – saxophone, keyboards

Other musicians
Jamie West-Oram – guitar, backing vocals
Don Snow – keyboards, vocals
Tim Cappello – keyboards, saxophone
Alan Clark – keyboards
Kenny Moore – keyboards
Gary Barnacle – saxophone

Production
John Hudson – producer, mixing (tracks 1.01, 1.02, 1.04–1.07, 1.09, 1.11, 1.12, 2.01–2.04, 2.06, 2.07, 2.11, 2.13, 2.14)
Mike Ging – assistant
Terry Britten – producer (tracks 1.03, 1.08, 1.10, 1.13, 1.14, 2.05, 2.08–2.10, 2.12)
Roger Davies – executive producer

Charts

Weekly charts

Year-end charts

Certifications and sales

References

1988 live albums
Tina Turner live albums
Capitol Records live albums
Grammy Award for Best Female Rock Vocal Performance